The election of the President of the Italian Chamber of Deputies who would serve through the legislature XIX of Italy took place on 13 and 14 October 2022, almost four weeks after the 2022 Italian general election. Lorenzo Fontana, a member of the Lega was elected on the fourth ballot with 222 votes.

Procedure 
The election takes place by secret ballot. A two-thirds supermajority of the whole membership is needed to win on the first ballot. On the second and third ballot, a two-thirds supermajority of votes cast (including blank ballots among the totals) suffices. Starting from the fourth ballot, the threshold is further lowered to a simple majority of members present.

History
As required by the assembly's standing orders, the election took place by secret ballot. Ettore Rosato, of Action – Italia Viva (A–IV), being the most senior member to have served as Vice President of the Chamber of Deputies in the previous legislature and to be re-elected in the incumbent legislature, served as acting presiding officer.

In early October the centre-right coalition, which had 237 seats, 36 more than the absolute majority, designed Riccardo Molinari, a member of the League, as its official candidate to the Presidency of the Chamber. On the first three ballots, as a two thirds supermajority was required according to the standing orders, and no political coalition had enough seats to reach such a number, party leaders instructed  MPs to cast blank ballots. Nonetheless, some members received a few votes on the first three ballots regardless.

Following the election of Ignazio La Russa as President of the Senate and tensions within the centre-right, Lorenzo Fontana replaced Molinari as the official candidate of the conservative coalition shortly after the third ballot took place.

Results

First ballot

Second ballot

Third ballot

Fourth ballot

See also 

 2022 President of the Italian Senate election

Notes

References 

2022 elections in Italy
October 2022 events in Italy
President of the Italian Chamber of Deputies elections